SHS may stand for:

Organisations
School-Home Support, a British children's charity
Scottish History Society
Shiv Sena, an Indian political party
Socialist History Society
Society for Health Systems
Strangers Helping Strangers
Swiss Heritage Society
SHS Group, a beverage company which owns the Merrydown brewery
SHS International, a medical nutrition products company

Places
Sheung Shui station, Hong Kong; MTR station code SHS
IATA code for Jingzhou Shashi Airport, China
Kingdom of SHS (1918–1929), a kingdom of Serbs, Croats and Slovenes

Technology
 The file extension for Shell Scrap Object Files produced by Microsoft Windows
Secure Hash Standard
Self-propagating high-temperature synthesis
Solar Home Systems - commonly referred as SHS in rural electrification
Square Hollow Section - see Structural steel
Structural Hollow Section - see Structural steel

High schools in the United States
Jesse O. Sanderson High School, Raleigh, North Carolina
Muncie Southside High School, Muncie Indiana
Pittsford Sutherland High School, Rochester, New York
Safford High School, Arizona
Sahuaro High School, Tucson, Arizona
Salida High School, Colorado
Saraland High School, Alabama
Sammamish High School, Bellevue, Washington
Sandusky High School, Ohio
Sanford High School, Maine
Saugus High School, Santa Clarita, California
Scarsdale High School, New York
Schaumburg High School, Illinois
Seagoville High School, Dallas, Texas
Seaholm High School, Birmingham, Michigan
Seaman High School, Topeka, Kansas
Sebeka High School, Minnesota
Seekonk High School, Massachusetts
Sehome High School, Bellingham, Washington
Senn High School, Chicago, Illinois
Service High School, Anchorage, Alaska
Seven Hills School, Cincinnati, Ohio
Sewanhaka High School, Floral Park, New York
Sharyland High School, Mission, Texas
Sherando High School , Frederick County, Virginia
Shortridge High School, Indianapolis, Indiana 
Sitka High School, Alaska
Snohomish High School, Washington
Soldotna High School, Alaska
Souhegan High School, Amherst, New Hampshire
Southaven High School, Mississippi
Southmoore High School, Moore, Oklahoma
Spencerport High School, Rochester, New York
Springboro High School, Ohio
Springbrook High School, Silver Spring, Maryland
Stafford Senior High School, Falmouth, Virginia
Stamford High School (Stamford, Connecticut)
Staples High School, Connecticut
Stansbury High School, Stansbury, Utah
Stanwood High School, Washington
Statesboro High School, Georgia
Steinbrenner High School, Lutz, Florida
Stevenson High School (Lincolnshire, Illinois)
Stow-Munroe Falls High School, Ohio
Stranahan High School, Fort Lauderdale, Florida
Streamwood High School, Illinois
Sturgis High School, Michigan
Suffern High School, New York
Sullivan High School, Indiana
Sultan Senior High School, Washington
Suncoast Community High School, Florida
Sunnyvale High School, Texas
Superior High School, Wisconsin
Syosset High School, New York
Sunset High School (Beaverton, Oregon)

High schools outside the United States
Sackville High School, Nova Scotia, Canada
Sacred Heart School (Bahrain), Isa Town, Bahrain
Sacred Heart National Secondary School, Sibu, Sarawak, Malaysia
Sagano High School, Kyoto City, Kyoto, Japan
Sanderson High School, East Kilbride, South Lanarkshire, Scotland 
Sattari High School, West Bengal, India
Selby High School, North Yorkshire, England 
Selwyn House School, Montreal, Quebéc, Canada
Shanghai High School, China
Sheffield High School, South Yorkshire, England
Shepparton High School, Victoria, Australia
Sherburn High School, North Yorkshire, England
Shrewsbury High School, Shropshire
Southborough High School, Surbiton, Greater London, England
Springhill High School, Rochdale, Greater Manchester, England
Stourport High School, England
Stroud High School, Gloucestershire, England
Stuttgart High School (Germany), Baden-Württemberg, Germany
Sunderland High School, Tyne and Wear, England
Suzhou High School, Jiangsu, China
Sydney Boys High School, Australia

Multiple high schools with the same name
Salem High School (disambiguation)
Salesian High School (disambiguation)
Saline High School (disambiguation)
Salisbury High School (disambiguation)
Seminole High School (disambiguation)
Shaw High School (disambiguation)
Shawnee High School (disambiguation)
Sheldon High School (disambiguation)
Sherwood High School (disambiguation)
Silverado High School (disambiguation)
Skyline High School (disambiguation)
Skyview High School (disambiguation)
Socorro High School (disambiguation)
Somerville High School (disambiguation)
Southridge High School (disambiguation)
Southside High School (disambiguation)
Spaulding High School (disambiguation)
Springfield High School (disambiguation)
Springville High School (disambiguation)
Sterling High School (disambiguation)
Stevens High School (disambiguation)
Stratford High School (disambiguation)
Sutton High School (disambiguation)

Other uses
Sarah Huckabee Sanders (born 1982), governor of Arkansas and former White House Press Secretary
Stephanie Herseth Sandlin (born 1970), former U.S. Congresswoman from South Dakota
Secondhand smoke
Yamaha SHS-10, a musical keyboard
Marvel Super Hero Squad, an action figure line
 Marvel Super Hero Squad (video game), based on the action figures
 The Super Hero Squad Show, based on the action figures
Structural hollow section, a construction member type (or square hollow section, a specific type)
Sweaty Hand Syndrome, another term for palmar hyperhidrosis, or excessive sweating on the palms or hands
SHS (football club), Dutch football club